Sullivan County Poor Home, also known as Lakeview Home, is a historic poorhouse located in Hamilton Township, Sullivan County, Indiana. It was designed by the architecture firm Wing & Mahurin and built in 1896–1897. It is a -story, asymmetrical, Romanesque Revival style brick building, consisting of a central section with flanking wings.  It features a projecting central tower with arched openings and a pyramidal roof and an octagonal tower.  Also on the property is a contributing one-story, two-room cottage. The home was named Lakeview Home in 1947, and remained in operation until 1998.

It was listed on the National Register of Historic Places in 2000.

References

Government buildings on the National Register of Historic Places in Indiana
Queen Anne architecture in Indiana
Romanesque Revival architecture in Indiana
Government buildings completed in 1896
Buildings and structures in Sullivan County, Indiana
National Register of Historic Places in Sullivan County, Indiana